Iron(III) azide, also called ferric azide, is a chemical compound with the formula . It is an extremely explosive, impact-sensitive, hygroscopic dark brown solid. This compound is used to prepare various azidoalkanes, such as n-butyl azide.

Preparation
This compound is prepared by the reaction of sodium azide and iron(III) sulfate in methanol:

Iron(III) azide can also be formed by pulse irradiation of a mixture of iron(II) perchlorate, sodium azide, and hydrogen peroxide. Under these conditions, a neutral N3 radical is formed, which oxidizes the iron(II) to iron(III); the iron(III) then promptly combines with azide ions.

References

Iron(III) compounds
Azides